Jersey Marine railway station was a railway station on the Rhondda and Swansea Bay line (R&SBR) which ran from the Rhondda Valley to Swansea on the Welsh coast in the county of Glamorgan. It lay 3 miles (4.8 km) east of Swansea.

History
Jersey Marine opened in 1895 and closed in 1935 or 1933. Briton Ferry Road station lay close by on the Great Western Railway Vale of Neath line.  
The R&SBR was absorbed by the Great Western Railway in the Grouping of the railways in 1923 as a result of the Railways Act 1921.

A four-storey octagonal tower stands near the hotel and the station site, built in the Victorian era and designed as a camera obscura at the Jersey Marine holiday resort. Workmen's halts were located to the east at Cape Platform and at Baldwin's Halt to the west.

Infrastructure
Jersey Marine station had a single platform on the Jersey Marine Hotel side of the line with a single shelter and ticket office. A footpath led from the vicinity of the hotel and its grounds to the platform. A signalbox stood to the west and by 1914 a siding ran parallel to the single track main line. Jersey Marine South Junction was located nearby. A Jersey Marine North Junction was also present. The station site has been obliterated by a road overbridge however the line remains open.

References

  

Former Great Western Railway stations
Disused railway stations in Neath Port Talbot
Railway stations in Great Britain opened in 1895
Railway stations in Great Britain closed in 1933
1933 establishments in Wales